PMSA may stand for:
Pakistan Maritime Security Agency (PMSA)
Port Said Medical Students' Association
Presbyterian and Methodist Schools Association
Primary Metropolitan Statistical Area (see: United States metropolitan area)
Project Management South Africa (PMSA)
Proviso Mathematics and Science Academy
Public Monuments and Sculpture Association